Cyathaspis is the type genus of the heterostracan order Cyathaspidiformes. Fossils are found in late Silurian strata in the Cunningham Creek Formation, New Brunswick, Canada and Europe, especially in the Downton Castle Sandstone of Great Britain and Gotland, Sweden. The living animal would have looked superficially like a tadpole, albeit covered in bony plates composed of the tissue aspidine, which is unique to heterostracan armor.

Cyathaspis ludensis is the earliest British vertebrate fossil. It was found in rocks at Leintwardine in Herefordshire, a noted fossil locality.

References 

Cyathaspidida
Cyathaspidiformes genera
Wenlock first appearances
Ludlow life
Silurian extinctions
Silurian jawless fish
Silurian fish of Europe
Fossils of Sweden
Silurian England
Silurian fish of North America
Paleozoic life of New Brunswick
Paleozoic life of Nunavut